Calicut Paragon is an Indian restaurant established in 1939. The restaurant is well known for the variety of ‘Malabar’ cuisines and enjoys cult status in Calicut (a region in the state of Kerala) and Dubai. It has been ranked as India's best restaurant for coastal cuisine by Times Now Foodie Awards and consistently ranked among Dubai's best restaurants by Time Out Awards and Ahlan Masala Awards.

History 

In 1939, under the patronage of Govindan Panhikeyil, Paragon restaurant was established. His son, P M Valsan eventually succeded him as the restaurant's manager. A third generation of  management, via Valsan's son Sumesh Govind soon came to the fore. In the initial years, the restaurant offered authentic Moplah and Thiyya cuisines which are an integral part of Malabar cuisine. Its success soon led to the creation of two new restaurants namely Salkara, M-Grill, and one bakery, namely Brown Town, all situated in Calicut, India.
Its exalted status in India led to its launch in Dubai, United Arab Emirates in 2005. In 2013, a second branch was opened up in another area of Dubai. Salkara was introduced in the Persian Gulf region in 2008.
In 2014 Paragon Restaurant opened their new outlet at Lulu International Shopping Mall Cochin, 2nd outlet in Cochin was opened at Aster Medicity Hospital Complex in the year of 2017. In the  April of 2018, Paragon anchored at Thiruvananthapuram Kerala. This includes Paragon in the 3 major cities in Kerala 
[Kozhikode, Ernakulam (Cochin) & Thiruvananthapuram].
Their catering division is one of the top rated catering in the hospitality industry.

Cuisine 

Besides Malabar cuisine, Paragon also specializes in Thai cuisine, Continental cuisine, Traditional Arabic cuisine and Chinese cuisines. The restaurant is popular for their selection of non-vegetarian dishes as well as their vegetarian selection.

Recognitions 

Calicut Paragon was awarded the Best Budget Time Out Award 2012 and the Best Coastal Food Award at the Foodie Awards 2013 which was sponsored by Times Now.  The restaurant garnered further acclaim with top celebrity chefs such as Silvena Rowe and Vineet Bhatia recommending the restaurant.  While popular icons such as Rahul Gandhi, Shyam Benegal, and Meera Nair have also mentioned their fondness for the Paragon's cuisine. 
A 'Food Safety Awareness' certificate was awarded to Calicut Paragon and Salkara by the Dubai Municipality, United Arab Emirates.

References

External links 
http://www.paragonrestaurant.net/

Restaurants in India
Buildings and structures in Kozhikode
Companies based in Kozhikode
Indian companies established in 1939
Restaurants established in 1939